Michael H. Lemelin is an American politician who is currently serving as a member of the Maine House of Representatives for the 88th district. He assumed office on December 2, 2020.

Early life and education 
Lemelin was born in Biddeford, Maine, and graduated from Brunswick High School. He earned a Bachelor of Science degree in aerospace engineering from Boston University.

Career 
From 1989 to 1996, Lemelin worked as a commercial and private pilot. He later worked in the restaurant industry, operating several Subway and Red Robin franchises around Augusta, Maine. Lemelin also owned as gym called Curves in Gardiner and manages his wife's chiropractic practice. He was an unsuccessful candidate for the Maine House of Representatives in 2018. He was elected to the House in 2020.

References 

Living people
Politicians from Biddeford, Maine
Brunswick High School (Maine) alumni
Boston University alumni
Republican Party members of the Maine House of Representatives
Year of birth missing (living people)